The 2019–20 Third Amateur Football League season was the 70th season of the Bulgarian Third Amateur Football League. The group is equivalent to the third level of the Bulgarian football pyramid with four divisions existing in it. The divisions themselves are geographically separated into North-West, North-East, South-East, and South-West, covering the football clubs of their respective zones. This is the second season after the reorganization of the Bulgarian football system, which saw the emergence of new competition formats, such as First and Second Professional Football Leagues. 

The matches were suspended on 13 March 2020 as a result of the  coronavirus pandemic. On 21 April 2020, the Bulgarian Football Union decided that the league will not be completed and the standings prior to the suspension of the fixtures were considered final. The one exception was to constitute the South-West zone where initially a separate playoff was to be held between Minyor Pernik and Septemvri Simitli to determine the group winner, but on 15 May the Bulgarian Football Union decided to promote the team from Pernik directly. No teams were relegated from the Third Amateur Football League, with the exception of teams that were expelled from the league for financial problems.

Team changes

To Third League
Promoted from Regional Divisions
 Chernolomets Popovo
 Shumen
 Drenovets
 Juventus Malchika
 Yambol
 Rodopa Smolyan
 Kyustendil
 Perun

Relegated from Second League
 Nesebar
 Dobrudzha Dobrich

Club movements between Third League and Second League
The champions of three Third League divisions gained promotion to the 2020–21 Second League: Dobrudzha Dobrich from North-East, Yantra Dabrova from North-West, Minyor Pernik from South-West, Sozopol from South-East group.

Club movements between Third League and the Regional Groups
 North-East: Volov Shumen was relegated last season to regional divisions.
 North-West: Yantra Polski Trambesh and Levski were relegated to regional amateur football groups.
 South-East: Sadovo and Asenovets Asenovgrad were relegated to regional amateur football groups.
 South-West: Sapareva Banya and Kyustendil were relegated to regional amateur football groups.

Northeast group

Stadia and locations

League table

Southeast group

Stadia and locations

League table

Northwest group

Stadia and locations

League table

Southwest group

Stadia and locations

League table

References

Third Amateur Football League (Bulgaria) seasons
3
Bulgaria
Belgium